Union Presbyterian Seminary is a Presbyterian seminary in Richmond, Virginia. It also has a non-residential campus in Charlotte, North Carolina and an online blended learning program.

History
As a result of efforts undertaken together by the Synod of Virginia and the Synod of North Carolina, Union Theological Seminary was founded in 1812 as the theological department of Hampden–Sydney College, located near Farmville, Virginia, and housed in what is now named Venable Hall. In 1895, Lewis Ginter, a financier and philanthropist in Richmond VA, donated eleven acres of land to the school, which was relocated to its current campus location on the north side of Richmond in 1898. The General Assembly's Training School (ATS) for Lay Workers was founded in Richmond in 1914 as a complementary institution intended to train "workers outside of the regular ordained ministry." In 1959 ATS was renamed the Presbyterian School of Christian Education (PSCE). PSCE offered a master's degree in Christian Education, and operated across the street from Union Seminary until 1997, when Union and PSCE were joined in federation, becoming Union-PSCE. In 2002, a commuter campus in Charlotte, North Carolina, began on the campus of Queens University of Charlotte, offering both M.Div. and M.A.C.E. degrees to part-time students.  The Charlotte campus for Union Presbyterian was relocated to its new facility on 5141 Sharon Road in 2012.

In 2009, Union's Board of Trustees voted to change the name of the institution to Union Presbyterian Seminary, partially as a means of distinguishing it from Union Theological Seminary in the City of New York.  In his address announcing the new name, seminary president Brian Blount emphasized the school's unique heritage of several "unions," as well as the school's Presbyterian identity.

For many years, the seminary operated WRFK, an FM radio station at 106.5 MHz. WRFK was sold to commercial interests in 1988.

Faculty
Union has a faculty of scholars in the fields of Bible, Christian education, theology, ethics, preaching, worship, church history, Christian leadership, and pastoral care.  Faculty come from a range of denominational backgrounds, including Baptist, Lutheran and Methodist. Notable faculty include president of Union Presbyterian Seminary, Brian Blount. Retired faculty include Bible scholar James L. Mays.

Student body
Union's student body is made up of about 180 students, with 90 students at the Richmond campus and another 84 students at the Charlotte campus. The majority of Union's students come from the Presbyterian tradition, but the seminary draws students from more than 20 Christian denominations, including Baptist, Methodist, Episcopalian, and Reformed. There are a number of international students as well from Ghana, South Korea, Switzerland, and other nations.

Students at Union take part in a number of student activities and seminary initiatives, such as mission and service activities to Shalom Farms in the city of Richmond.

Campuses

Union's Richmond campus includes two chapels: the historic Watts Chapel, located in Watts Hall, which also serves as a classroom and administration building, and the state of the art Lake Chapel, located in the campus's Early Center, a classroom and office building completed in 2008. The Richmond campus also includes the Belk student center, dormitories, student apartments and guest housing, as well as recreation fields, community gardens and tennis courts. Union's William Smith Morton Library was completed in 1996, and includes over 900,000 volumes and grows at a rate of about 5,500 volumes per year.

The seminary's Charlotte campus is located on 5141 Sharon Road. This facility opened in 2012 houses a chapel, library, classrooms, a regional Christian Education Resource Center, and office facilities.

Academics
The seminary only offers graduate degrees:
Master of Arts In Christian Education (M.A.C.E.)
Master of Arts in Christian Education in Global Format (Global M.A.C.E.)
Master of Arts in Public Theology (M.A.P.T)
Master of Divinity (M.Div.)
Dual Degree Program—Master of Divinity/Master of Arts in Christian Education (M.Div./M.A.C.E.)
Dual Degree Program—Master of Divinity/Master of Arts in Public Theology (M.Div/M.A.P.T)
Master of Theology (Th.M.)
Doctor of Ministry (D.Min.)

Notable alumni

John M. P. Atkinson: minister; tenth president of Hampden-Sydney College; first president of The Virginia Educational Association
Myron Augsburger: pastor, theologian, fifth president of Eastern Mennonite University
John Bright (biblical scholar)
Erskine Clarke: historian, author, retired professor at Columbia Theological Seminary, winner of the Bancroft Prize(2006)
Benjamin T. Conner: author, professor of Practical Theology at Western Theological Seminary, director of graduate studies in Disability Ministry
Jill Y. Crainshaw: professor of religion, and Vice Dean of the Faculty at Wake Forest University 
Kathy Dawson, Associate Professor of Christian Education and Director of M.A.P.T. Program at Columbia Theological Seminary; Association of Presbyterian Church Educators' 2015 Educator of the Year
Bob Childress
Pierre Etienne, French poet and monastic brother of the Taizé Community
T. David Gordon, Reformed theologian at Grove City College and Gordon Conwell Theological Seminary
Graeme Goldsworthy: Australian-Anglican evangelist, author, retired professor at Moore Theological College
George Wilson McPhail: minister, sixth president of Lafayette college and fifth president of Davidson College
Thomas Mar Makarios: bishop of the Indian Orthodox Church; founder of the United States and Canada diocese
Douglas Oldenburg a President Emeritus at Columbia Theological Seminary and the former moderator of the 210th General Assembly of the Presbyterian Church (USA)
Katherine Paterson, author of Bridge to Terabithia, Jacob Have I Loved; two time winner of the  Newbery Medal and of the  National Book Award
Roy Kinneer Patteson, Jr., Bachelor of Divinity degree in 1960 Union Theological Seminary
William D. Reynolds; missionary to Korea; lead translator of the first Korean Old and New testament, professor
W. Taylor Reveley IV, political scientist,  26th president of Longwood University
Jay W. Richards: author, business professor, fellow at The Discovery Institute, executive editor of The Stream 
Holmes Rolston III: philosopher; professor at Colorado State University; winner of the Templeton Prize(2003)
John Bunyan Shearer: president of Stewart College which became Rhodes College, eighth president of Davidson College
David R. Bauer, Biblical studies author and Ralph W. Beeson Professor of Inductive Biblical Studies and Dean of the School of Biblical Interpretation at Asbury Theological Seminary
Frances Taylor Gench, New Testament scholar
Theodore Wardlaw: theologian, president Austin Theological Seminary
V. Neil Wyrick: pastor, popular Christian author and actor
Leontine Kelly: first black woman to become a bishop in a major Christian denomination (Methodism)

References

Further reading

External links

Official website

 
1812 establishments in Virginia
Educational institutions established in 1812
Education in Charlotte, North Carolina
Education in Richmond, Virginia
Universities and colleges accredited by the Southern Association of Colleges and Schools
University and college buildings on the National Register of Historic Places in Virginia
National Register of Historic Places in Richmond, Virginia
Presbyterian Church (USA) seminaries
Presbyterianism in North Carolina
Presbyterianism in Virginia
Seminaries and theological colleges in North Carolina
Seminaries and theological colleges in Virginia